Boxwell SSSI is a  biological Site of Special Scientific Interest in Gloucestershire, notified in 1954. The site is listed in the 'Cotswold District' Local Plan 2001-2011 (on line) as a Key Wildlife Site (KWS).

Location and habitat
The site is within the Cotswold Area of Outstanding Natural Beauty, and is situated on a steep south-west facing Jurassic limestone slope. The site is considered of national importance being one of only three in the country where Box (Buxus sempervirens) is believed to be native. The site represents the best example of tall scrub-woodland habitat in Britain.

References

SSSI Source
 Natural England SSSI information on the citation
 Natural England SSSI information on the Boxwell unit

External links
 Natural England (SSSI information)

Sites of Special Scientific Interest in Gloucestershire
Sites of Special Scientific Interest notified in 1954
Cotswolds